Abdón Porte (1893 – 5 March 1918) was a Uruguayan footballer who played as defensive midfielder. Nicknamed El Indio he won many titles with his club Nacional, and also a Copa América with the Uruguay national team. He committed suicide on 5 March 1918, by shooting himself in the center of the field at Estadio Gran Parque Central, an incident still remembered by the sport community of Uruguay.

Club career

Porte arrived in Montevideo in 1908, where he played for Colón, then moving to defunct club Libertad. He was later transferred to Nacional, debuting on 12 March 1911, v. Dublin F.C. Porte played as a right back.

Playing for Nacional, Porte gained notability being also team's captain. He was defined as a fierce midfielder and good at stopping rival players and heading the ball. He played a total of 207 games for Nacional, winning 19 titles with the club.

Porte was cited by writer Xosé de Enríquez in his book Hacia el Campo van los Albos:

Porte would play his last match v. Charley F.C. (Nacional won by 3–1) before committing suicide one day later.

International career
Porte was a member of the Uruguay squad that won the 1917 South American Championship but did not play a game at the tournament.

Death
Before starting the 1918 season, Nacional's committee decided to replace Porte by defender Alfredo Zibechi as starting player, sending Porte to the bench due to his poor performance during the last games played with the club. On 4 March, Nacional played Charley F.C., winning by 3–1 with Porte playing the entire match at a good level. That night, executives and players met at the club headquarters for a celebration as was usual. Porte left the club at 1:00 a.m. and took a tram to the Estadio Gran Parque Central, Nacional's venue.

Once Porte arrived at Parque Central, he went into the centre of the field and shot himself. His body and a suicide note were found the next morning. A dog found his body, drawing it to his master, Severino Castillo. Porte's body had two letters, one for the president of Nacional and the other to a relative.

The people of Uruguay were shocked by the news. Porte was buried at Cementerio de La Teja. Montevideo Wanderers offered Nacional to play a friendly match for the benefit of Porte's family while the rest of the Uruguayan clubs expressed their solidarity to Nacional.

Legacy
Writer Horacio Quiroga was inspired on Porte's death to write his short story, "Juan Polti", published in 1918 in Atlántida magazine of Buenos Aires. Another Uruguayan writer, Eduardo Galeano, remembered Porte in a short chapter in his book El Fútbol a Sol y Sombra entitled "Muerte en la cancha" (Death on the pitch).

The club named "Abdón Porte" the western stand of Gran Parque Central. In March 2008 the Uruguayan Post Office printed a stamp honoring Porte. On August, 2013, Nacional's supporters made a mosaic with the face of Abdón Porte.

Honours
Nacional
Uruguayan Primera División:  1912, 1915, 1916, 1917
Copa Competencia: 1912, 1913, 1914, 1915
Copa de Honor: 1913, 1914, 1915, 1916, 1917
Tie Cup: 1913, 1915
Copa de Honor Cousenier: 1915, 1916, 1917
Copa Aldao: 1916

Uruguay
Copa América: 1917

References

1893 births
1918 suicides
People from Durazno Department
Uruguayan footballers
Uruguay international footballers
Club Nacional de Football players
Suicides by firearm in Uruguay
Burials at Cementerio de La Teja, Montevideo
Copa América-winning players
Association football midfielders
1918 deaths